Joseph or Joe Jordan may refer to:
 Joseph Jordan (Royal Navy officer), English naval officer
 Joe Jordan (born 1951), Scottish international football player and coach
 Joe Jordan (politician) (born 1958), Canadian politician
 Joe Jordan (musician) (1882–1971), ragtime and jazz musician
 Amos Jordan (1922–2018), often known by the nickname "Joe" Jordan, United States Army general
 Joseph A. Jordan Jr. (1924–1991), civil rights activist, lawyer and judge
 Joseph Jordania (born 1954), Australian-Georgian ethnomusicologist and evolutionary musicologist
 Joseph Jordan (doctor) (1787–1873), English medical doctor
 Joseph M. Jordan (1922–2014), American law enforcement officer
 Joe Jordan (hurler) (born 1987), Irish hurler